Egaa Gymnasium is a school of secondary education and a Gymnasium in Aarhus, Denmark. The school offers the 3 year Matriculation examination (STX) programme divided in 4 main lines; language, arts, social sciences and natural sciences. The school was subordinated to the Aarhus County until 2007 when the county was abolished and since then the school has been an independent self-owning institution.

Building 
The school was built in 2006, designed by Cubo Architects. The building costs were DKK 183 million and it is constructed in concrete, steel and glass as a rectangular cube and island in a flat, open landscape. Classrooms and workshops are placed around an open-air communal area and the building is characterized by open spaces and lightness.

References

External links
 Egaa Gymnasium Website

Gymnasiums in Aarhus
Educational institutions established in 2006
2006 establishments in Denmark